The Jatiya Samajtantrik Dal ('National Socialist Party of Bangladesh',  JSD or 'জাসদ', JASAD) is a political party in Bangladesh. The party was founded by Serajul Alam Khan.

The current party president is Sharif Nurul Ambia, with Executive President Moinuddin Khan Badol MP, and General Secretary Nazmul Haq Prodhan MP.

History

The Jatiya Samajtantrik Dal (JASAD) was formed in 1972 when it split from Bangladesh Chhatra League, the student wing of the Bangladesh Awami League, under the leadership of Serajul Alam Khan, M. A. Jalil, ASM Abdur Rab and Shajahan Siraj. It had an armed wing, Gonobahini, led by Colonel Abu Taher and Hasanul Haq Inu, Kazi Aref Ahmed, Monirul Islam, Sharif Nurul Ambia that led a violent left-wing insurgency against the government of Sheikh Mujibur Rahman. Their aim was to form a new left wing democratic national government, for facilitating establishing a socialist state with Bangladeshi characteristics. This led the government to form the Jatiya Rakkhi Bahini, the aim of which was to counter insurgency by the Jatiya Samajtantrik Dal (JASAD) activists.

Assassination of Sheikh Mujibur Rahman
Before the coup of 15 August 1975, Jatiya Samajtantrik Dal had planned to organize a mass upsurge to form a democratic national government replacing Sheikh Mujibur Rahman.

After Sheikh Mujibur Rahman and his family were assassinated on 15 August 1975, Jatiya Samajtantrik Dal leader Abu Taher showed his support and remarked: "The corpse of Sheikh Mujib should have been thrown into The Bay of Bengal".

On 7 November 1975, forces loyal to Colonel Abu Taher rescued army chief Ziaur Rahman from house arrest. When Ziaur Rahman realized that Abu Taher was moving the country into a direction of leftist communism which contradicted Zia's right wing views, Zia declared martial law, formed the right wing Bangladesh Nationalist Party and cracked down on the Jatiyo Samajtantrik Dal by executing Abu Taher and sentencing other leaders to various prison terms.

Factions
During Ziaur Rahman's rule, Jatiya Samajtantrik Dal split up twice. The party fragmented again during the regime of Hussain Muhammad Ershad in the 1980s, with ASM Abdur Rab and Shajahan Siraj heading two separate factions. Abdur Rab's faction, Jatiya Samajtantrik Dal-JSD, became the opposition after taking part in the 1988 elections that were boycotted by all major political parties. After the Bangladesh Nationalist Party (BNP) came to power in 1991, Jatiya Samajtantrik Dal allied itself with former rivals Bangladesh Awami League to counter growing BNP and right wing influence in the country. ASM Abdur Rab later served as a minister from 1996 to 2001 in the Awami League-led government. After the BNP returned to power in 2001, Shajahan Siraj merged his party with it.

Meanwhile, Inu, who became MP after winning elections as a grand alliance nominee with the victorious Awami League's boat as his symbol in 2008, was made Information Minister. after another split The General Secretary of the Inu-led faction is Shirin Akhter.

See also
 Jatiya Samajtantrik Dal-JSD

References

External links
 

 
1972 establishments in Bangladesh
Political history of Bangladesh
Muslim League breakaway groups
Political parties established in 1972
Political parties in Bangladesh
Socialist parties in Asia
Socialist parties in Bangladesh
21st-century Bangladeshi women politicians
Women members of the Jatiya Sangsad